Tripteridia dinosia is a moth in the family Geometridae. It is found on Borneo. The habitat consists of mountainous areas.

References

Moths described in 1926
Tripteridia